The seventh event of the 2008 Samsung Super League was held in Dublin, Ireland on 8 August 2008 during the 2008 Dublin Horse Show. The Great Britain won the event, finishing with only fourteen penalties over the two rounds of competition, five fewer than host nation Ireland's nineteen faults. Jessica Kürten of Ireland, Harry Smolders of the Netherlands, and Hillary Dobbs of the United States were the only riders to complete a clear round and were each awarded one point in the top rider standings. A €156,000 purse was offered at the CSIO***** event, with each of the eight competing teams receiving a share.

Competing teams

Results

Round A

Round B

References
General

Dublin
Dublin Horse Show
2008 in Irish sport
Samsung Super League